Augustin-Alexandre Dumont, known as Auguste Dumont (4 August 1801, in Paris – 28 January 1884, in Paris) was a French sculptor.

Biography
He was one of a long line of famous sculptors, the great-grandson of Pierre Dumont, son of Jacques-Edme Dumont and brother to the pianist and composer Louise Farrenc. In 1818, he started studies at the École des Beaux-Arts in Paris; he was a pupil of Pierre Cartellier. In 1823, he was awarded the Prix de Rome for his sculptures, and went to study at the French Academy in Rome.

In 1830, he returned to France. In 1853 he became a teacher at the École des Beaux-Arts. A disease kept him from working after 1875.

Práce
 Infant Bacchus Nurtured by the Nymph Leucothea (1830; Semur-en-Auxois, Musée Municipal)
 Statue of Nicolas Poussin for the Salle Ordinaire des Séances in the Palais de l'Institut de France, Paris (1835)
 Statue of Maréchal Thomas Bugeaud de la Piconnerie (~1850; version, Versailles)

References

 Simone Hoog, (preface by Jean-Pierre Babelon, in collaboration with Roland Brossard), Musée national de Versailles. Les sculptures. I- Le musée, Réunion des musées nationaux, Paris, 1993
 Pierre Kjellberg, Le Nouveau guide des statues de Paris, La Bibliothèque des Arts, Paris, 1988
 Emmanuel Schwartz, Les Sculptures de l'École des Beaux-Arts de Paris. Histoire, doctrines, catalogue, École nationale supérieure des Beaux-Arts, Paris, 2003, p. 146

External links

1801 births
1884 deaths
Artists from Paris
Prix de Rome for sculpture
Members of the Académie des beaux-arts
École des Beaux-Arts alumni
Academic staff of the École des Beaux-Arts
19th-century French sculptors
French male sculptors
19th-century French male artists